Nino Besozzi (6 February 1901 – 2 February 1971) was an Italian film actor. He appeared in more than 50 films between 1931 and 1970. He was born in and died in Milan, Italy.

Life and career 
After graduating in accountancy, Besozzi made his acting debut in the Irma Gramatica's theatre company. In a short time he became popular as a brilliant actor, working with some of the biggest stage names of the time, including Ruggero Ruggeri, Vittorio De Sica, Dario Niccodemi, Andreina Pagnani, Dina Galli, Sarah Ferrati, Armando Falconi, Enrico Viarisio, Ernesto Almirante. He had his cinema breakout in The Private Secretary  (1931), and got numerous leading roles in the Fascist-era popular genre Telefoni Bianchi; after the war he was mainly active as a comedic character actor. In the early 1950s he got a large personal success on stage with the comedy play Siamo tutti milanesi. He also worked on radio and television. He died of a cerebral thrombosis shortly before his 70th birthday.

Partial filmography

 The Private Secretary (1931) - Il banchiere Roberto Berri
 One Night with You (1932) - Il giovine scapolo
 Paradise (1932) - Max
 Non son gelosa (1933) - Gianni Berti
 T'amerò sempre (1933) - Mario Fabbrini
 Non c'è bisogno di denaro (1933) - Paolo
 Il presidente della Ba.Ce.Cre.Mi. (1933) - Ingegnere Rossi
 Model Wanted (1933) - Alberto Bacci
 Kiki (1934) - Raimondo
 Unripe Fruit (1934) - Giorgio Verni
 Il serpente a sonagli (1935) - Franz - l'ispettore di polizia
 Thirty Seconds of Love (1936) - Piero Gualandi
 To Live (1936) - Mario Deli
 Nina non far la stupida (1937) - Momoleto
 The Two Misanthropists (1937) - Damiano Bertelet
 Like the Leaves (1938) - Max
 Amicizia (1938) - Giovanni Salvatori
 The Lady in White (1938) - Giulio Gualandi
 We Were Seven Sisters (1939) - Leonardo Varani
 I've Lost My Husband! (1939) - Conte Giuliano Arenzi
 Mille chilometri al minuto (1939) - Guido Renzi
 La danza dei milioni (1940) - Gustavo Wiesinger
 Barbablù (1941) - Il conte Juan de Sezka
 Non mi sposo più (1942) - Roland
 La signorina (1942) - Francesco Roero
 Rossini (1942) - Gioacchino Rossini
 La maestrina (1942) - Il sindaco
 La maschera e il volto (1943) - Il conte Paolo Grazia
 Tre ragazze cercano marito (1944) - Il professore Ottavio
 Merry Chase (1945) - Andrea, il marito
 Down with Misery (1945) - Giovanni Straselli, suo marito
 Vanity (1947)
 Lo sciopero dei milioni (1947)
 Be Seeing You, Father (1948) - Tetriaca
 Accadde al penitenziario (1955) - Prof. Zaccanti
 L'ultimo amante (1955) - Il dottor Moriesi
 Destinazione Piovarolo (1955) - Il ministro dei transporti
 Lucky to Be a Woman (1956) - Paolo Magnano
 Porta un bacione a Firenze (1956) - Il conte Pineschi
 Classe di ferro (1957) - Editore Martelli
 Vacanze a Ischia (1957) - Guido Lucarelli
 The Law Is the Law (1958) - Le maréchal des carabiniers / Il Maresciallo
 Wild Cats on the Beach (1959) - Carsoli
 Walter e i suoi cugini (1961) - Commendator Spallanzoni
 Whisky a mezzogiorno (1962)
 Pardon, Are You For or Against? (1966) - Camillo Tasca
 Il terribile ispettore (1969) - Presidente Eial
 Dovidenia v pekle, priatelia (1970) - Colonel

References

External links

1901 births
1971 deaths
Italian male film actors
20th-century Italian male actors
Italian male radio actors
Italian male television actors
Italian male stage actors